Chambers County Airport  (also known as Oscar F. Nelson, Jr. Memorial Airport) is a county-owned general aviation airport located in unincorporated Chambers County, Texas, United States  east of the city of Anahuac.

References

External links

Airports in Greater Houston
Buildings and structures in Chambers County, Texas
Transportation in Chambers County, Texas